Carabus marietti akensis is a subspecies of ground beetle in the  Carabinae subfamily that is endemic to Turkey. The species are black coloured with purple pronotum.

References

marietti akensis
Beetles described in 1889
Endemic fauna of Turkey